Polyglyphanodon is an extinct genus of Polyglyphanodontid lizard containing the species P. sternbergi from the Maastrichtian aged North Horn Formation of Utah. The species is known from several mostly complete and partial skeletons. It is distinguished by its transversely orientated interlocking teeth, which suggest a herbivorous diet

References

Prehistoric reptile genera
Cretaceous reptiles of North America
Paleontology in Utah
Taxa named by Charles W. Gilmore
Fossil taxa described in 1940